Mabel is an Italo dance project, renowned for their singles Disco Disco, Bum Bum and Don't Let Me Down. The group's frontman was Paolo Ferrali. They had reached the top of the sales chart in Italy, France, Germany and Austria.

From 2000 until now the group had performed more than 100 live performance in Italy and many foreign discos and clubs. The group participated in some most prestigious telecast like German telecast Viva Interaktiv, RTL2, GIGA TV etc.

Discography

Studio albums
 Destination (2002)

The band had the following releases under the same Album Cover, Destination, which had a cover from 1999 to 2002, when the album was considered closed for releases.

DJ Janis VS Plus One, did a remix on the Bum Bum and Don't Let Me Down too.

Singles

References

Les-Charts - Mabel
A list of Mabel releases
Albums by mabel

External links
Biography on Official website, retrieved from archive.org
Biography on the new Official Website

Italian dance music groups